Brudzew may refer to the following places:
Brudzew, Kalisz County in Greater Poland Voivodeship (west-central Poland)
Brudzew, Turek County in Greater Poland Voivodeship (west-central Poland)
Brudzew, Łódź Voivodeship (central Poland)